Vladimir Dmitriyevich Gerasimov (12 April 1989 – 9 March 2018) was a Russian professional footballer who played as a striker.

Death
Gerasimov died on 9 March 2018 in Zhejiang province, China, after a hit-and-run incident. Gerasimov was knocked from his electric scooter onto a busy street by a car; the driver fled the scene without seeing to Gerasimov's injuries. No passers-by assisted Gerasimov. He died of his injuries two hours later while still lying unattended in the street. Gerasimov was 28 years old.

References

External links
 Player page by sportbox.ru  
 
 

1989 births
2018 deaths
People from Korolyov, Moscow Oblast
Association football forwards
Russian footballers
Czech First League players
FK Bohemians Prague (Střížkov) players
Russian expatriate footballers
Expatriate footballers in the Czech Republic
Russian expatriate sportspeople in the Czech Republic
Motorcycle road incident deaths
Road incident deaths in the People's Republic of China
Sportspeople from Moscow Oblast